Woodbury Langdon (1739 – January 13, 1805) was a merchant, statesman and justice from Portsmouth, New Hampshire. He was the brother of John Langdon, a Founding Father who served as both senator from and Governor of New Hampshire, and father-in-law of Edmund Roberts.

Early life
Langdon attended the Latin grammar school at Portsmouth, then went into the counting house of Henry Sherburne, a prominent local merchant. He was described as a large, handsome man—indeed, a contemporary recalled that the three handsomest men of that era were George Washington, Lord Whitworth and Woodbury Langdon.  Langdon's business success enabled him to build and furnish a substantial home on State Street. In 1781, his home was destroyed in a fire which started in the barn where the Music Hall now stands. He rebuilt the three-story brick mansion in 1785, called "the costliest house anywhere about," and occupied it for the remainder of his life.

American Revolution
When the American Revolutionary War broke out in 1775, Langdon sailed to London to secure considerable monies he had invested there. The attempt was unsuccessful, and two years later he left empty-handed for New York. Upon arrival, British Commander-in-Chief General William Howe suspected Langdon's loyalty to the Crown, and consequently restricted him to the city. Entreaties to release Langdon, written both by his prominent friends in England and younger brother, John, were ignored. Nevertheless, in December 1777 he managed to escape.

If Langdon's leanings towards American Independence were at all uncertain before his confinement in Manhattan, they became unmistakable afterwards. In spring of 1779, he was elected as one of New Hampshire's delegates to the Continental Congress, serving a year. In 1780, 1781 and 1785 he was re-elected, but chose to remain in New Hampshire and serve at the revolutionary capital in Exeter, where he was a representative from 1778–1779 and a member of the Executive Council from 1781-1784.

Post-Revolution
Langdon was appointed an associate justice of the New Hampshire Superior Court in 1782.

He resigned after a year despite the legislature's repeated requests that he remain in office. In 1786, he again accepted the job, and held it until January 1791. But on June 17, 1790, he became the first state superior court justice to be impeached. The New Hampshire House of Representatives voted 35-29 to impeach him for neglecting his duties, finding that he had failed to attend sessions of the court in outlying counties in order to pursue his commercial interests in Portsmouth. It also resented his charge that the legislature failed to provide honorable salaries for judges and interfered in court decisions, calling his conduct " ... impertinent and unbecoming to his office." The trial in the state senate was postponed, with Langdon resigning his position before it could commence.

In the meantime, President Washington had appointed him in December 1790 as a commissioner to settle Revolutionary War claims. In 1796 and 1797, Langdon attempted a comeback by running for Congress, but lost.

Death and burial
Langdon died in Portsmouth on January 13, 1805, and was buried in the North Cemetery at Portsmouth.

Family
In 1765, Langdon married Henry Sherburne's daughter Sarah, who was then 16. Their children included:

Henry Sherburne Langdon (1766-1858), who married Ann Eustis, the sister of William Eustis.
Woodbury Langdon (1768-1770)
Sarah Langdon (1770-1795), the wife of Robert Harris of Portsmouth
Mary Ann Langdon (b. 1772)
Amelia Langdon (b. 1773)
Woodbury Langdon (b. 1774), who became a resident of New Orleans, and died without marrying
Dorothy Wentworth Langdon (b. 1775)
Caroline Langdon (1780-1865), the wife of William Eustis.
John Langdon (1781-1852), who married Charlotte Ladd and relocated to Buffalo, New York
Harriet (b. 1783)
Joshua Brackett Langdon (b. 1784), who died at sea
Walter Langdon (1786-1847), who married Dorothea Astor, the daughter of John Jacob Astor, and became a resident of Hyde Park, New York
Catherine Whipple Langdon (1787-1839), the wife of Edmund Roberts of Portsmouth.

Legacy
Governor and historian William Plumer reflected:

He was a man of great independence and decision - bold, keen and sarcastic, and spoke his mind of men and measures with great freedom ... .He was naturally inclined to be arbitrary and haughty, but his sense of what was right, and his pride prevented him from doing intentional evil.

Langdon's neoclassical mansion was purchased in 1830 by a company which converted it into an inn called The Rockingham House. In 1870, it was purchased by Frank Jones, local alemaker and hotelier, who had it remodeled and enlarged into the city's most fashionable hotel. A fire in 1884 badly damaged the building except for Woodbury Langdon's original dining room, which was retained when the hotel was rebuilt the following year. The Rockingham Hotel is today a condominium.

References

Sources
 
 Biography at Seacoast New Hampshire website
 
 Gurney, C. S. (1902), Portsmouth, Historic and Picturesque, The Lakeside Press, Portland, Maine

1739 births
1805 deaths
Continental Congressmen from New Hampshire
18th-century American politicians
New Hampshire state court judges
Politicians from Portsmouth, New Hampshire
People of colonial New Hampshire
People of New Hampshire in the American Revolution
Members of the Executive Council of New Hampshire
Presidents of the New Hampshire Senate
Colonial American merchants
Burials in New Hampshire